Xixi may refer to:

People
Xi Xi (西西; born 1938), Chinese novelist and poet

Places

Towns
Xixi, Huilai County (溪西镇), town in Guangdong
Xixi, Yongkang, Zhejiang (西溪镇), town
 Xixi, Luxi (洗溪镇), a town of Luxi County, Hunan

Townships
Xixi Township, Yongding County, Fujian
Xixi Township, Suichuan County, in Suichuan County, Jiangxi
Xixi Township, Hanyuan County, in Hanyuan County, Sichuan
Xixi Township, Xichang, in Xichang, Sichuan
Xixi Township, Yongjia County, Zhejiang

Creeks
Xixi ("West Creek") is a fairly common hydronym in China. Examples include:

 Xixi, an affluent of the Jiulong in southern Fujian
 Xixi, an stream running to the Taiwan Strait in Xiamen

Other
Xixi National Wetland Park (西溪国家湿地公园) in Hangzhou